Espidabad (also Romanized as Espīdābād) is a village in Bazman Rural District, Bazman District, Iranshahr County, Sistan and Baluchestan Province, Iran. At the 2006 census, its population was 156, in 34 families.

References 

Populated places in Iranshahr County